Aide or AIDE may refer to:

People 
 Aide Iskandar (born 1975), Singaporean professional soccer player
 Charles Hamilton Aide (1826–1906), English author and artist

Other uses 
 An aide is a personal assistant
 aide-de-camp military officer 
 Aide (deity), a purported Basque deity
 Aide-mémoire, a document serving as a memory aid, a reminder or memorandum
 AIDE (software), (Advanced Intrusion Detection Environment). An open source host-based intrusion detection system
 Alliance of Independent Democrats in Europe, a former political party at European level
 Advanced Intrusion Detection Environment, an intrusion detection software package

See also 
 Aid (disambiguation)
 Aides (disambiguation)